is a skyscraper complex built by Mori Building in the Toranomon district of Minato, Tokyo, Japan. Designed by Nihon Sekkei, it is located around the new Loop Road No. 2, a surface artery that connects the Shinbashi and Toranomon districts.

Design
The complex features four buildings: Toranomon Hills Station Tower,
Toranomon Hills Mori Tower, Toranomon Hills Residential Tower and Toranomon Hills Business Tower.

The project has a logo made of four black vertical bars forming a letter "M" (and also resembling the "門" kanji of the Toranomon name). It also has a mascot called , which is developed by Fujiko Pro, the company who owns the rights to the Japanese manga character Doraemon.

History
There have been plans since 1946 to build a new arterial road between Toranomon and Shimbashi as part of a loop road around central Tokyo. The Toranomon segment was popularly referred to as the "MacArthur Road", after General Douglas MacArthur, who led the Allied liberation of Japan following World War II, making reference to the proximity of the United States Embassy compound in nearby Akasaka. The plan remained unrealized for decades due to the government's inability to expropriate the necessary prime real estate in central Tokyo. A solution was finalized around 1989, which involved building a new skyscraper above the road and offering to relocate displaced residents into the building.

Mori Building formally announced the Toranomon Hills name on March 1, 2013.

The first building of the complex to be completed was the Toranomon Hills Mori Tower, which opened in 2014. The Business Tower was finished in 2020, while the Residential Tower was completed in 2022. The last of the four skyscrapers, Station Tower, is set to be completed in 2023.

Tenants
Government Pension Investment Fund, the world's largest retirement fund, has its headquarters on the 7th floor of Toranomon Hills Mori Tower, while the law firm of K&L Gates has its Tokyo office on the 28th floor and ArcelorMittal's is located on the 6th floor. The Japan headquarters of Novartis and State Street Corporation are also located in the Mori Tower.

Gallery

References

External links

 

Skyscraper office buildings in Tokyo
Skyscraper hotels in Tokyo
Residential skyscrapers in Tokyo
Retail buildings in Tokyo
Buildings and structures in Minato, Tokyo
Mori Building
Redevelopment projects in Japan